Hoo Pang Ron (born 29 March 1998) is a Malaysian badminton player. He began to play badminton at the age of ten, and started competing or playing competitively when he was eighteen.

Personal life 
Hoo is the younger brother of Vivian Hoo, fellow professional badminton player.

Achievements

Southeast Asian Games 
Mixed doubles

BWF World Tour (1 title) 
The BWF World Tour, which was announced on 19 March 2017 and implemented in 2018, is a series of elite badminton tournaments sanctioned by the Badminton World Federation (BWF). The BWF World Tour is divided into levels of World Tour Finals, Super 1000, Super 750, Super 500, Super 300 (part of the HSBC World Tour), and the BWF Tour Super 100.

Mixed doubles

BWF International Challenge/Series (3 titles, 2 runners-up) 
Mixed doubles

  BWF International Challenge tournament
  BWF International Series tournament

References

External links 
 

1998 births
Living people
Sportspeople from Kuala Lumpur
Malaysian sportspeople of Chinese descent
Malaysian male badminton players
Competitors at the 2021 Southeast Asian Games
Southeast Asian Games silver medalists for Malaysia
Southeast Asian Games medalists in badminton
21st-century Malaysian people